Maurice Henry Lecorney Pryce (24 January 1913 – 24 July 2003) was a British physicist.

Pryce was born in Croydon to an Anglo-Welsh father and French mother, and in his teens attended the Royal Grammar School, Guildford. After a few months in Heidelberg to add German to the French that had been his first language at home, he went to Trinity College, Cambridge. In 1935 he went to Princeton University, supported by a Commonwealth Fund Fellowship (now Harkness Fellowship) where he worked with Wolfgang Pauli and John von Neumann, obtaining his Ph.D. with a thesis on The wave mechanics of the photon under the supervision of Max Born and Ralph Fowler. In 1937 he returned to England as a Fellow of Trinity, until in 1939 he was appointed Reader in Theoretical Physics at Liverpool University under James Chadwick. In 1941 he joined the Admiralty Signals Establishment (now part of the Admiralty Research Establishment) to work on radar. In 1944 he joined the British atomic energy team in Montreal designing nuclear reactors, but in 1945 returned to England, first to Cambridge and then in 1946 to Oxford, where he was appointed Wykeham Professor of Physics.

Among his doctoral students were Anatole Abragam and John Clive Ward. In 1947, in collaboration  with John Ward, he co-authored a paper that originated on the probability amplitude of two entangled quanta propagating in opposite directions.

In 1950 Klaus Fuchs was head of the theoretical physics group at AERE, Harwell. When Fuchs was arrested for supplying atomic secrets to the USSR, Pryce served part-time as his replacement. In 1954 he moved to the University of Bristol as Head of the Physics Department. In 1964 he returned to North America, first to the University of Southern California and then in 1968 to the University of British Columbia. From 1968 to 1978 he served on the Technical Advisory Committee (for nuclear waste management) of Atomic Energy of Canada Limited.

Distinctions 
 1935 Fellow, Cambridge Philosophical Society
 1936 Member, American Physical Society
 1938 Fellow, Royal Astronomical Society
 1946 Fellow, Physical Society (London); Member of Council 1959–61
 1951 Fellow of the Royal Society
 1957 Member of Radar and Signals Advisory Board, Ministry of Supply
 1958 Member of Electronics Research Council, Ministry of Aviation
 1959 Member (later Chairman) Advisory Council, Royal Military College of Science, Shrivenham
 1960 Honorary Member of Council, Société de Physique, Paris

Personal life 
In 1939 Pryce married Born's daughter Susanne Mararete.

References 

1913 births
2003 deaths
English physicists
Quantum physicists
People educated at Royal Grammar School, Guildford
Alumni of Trinity College, Cambridge
Fellows of Trinity College, Cambridge
Princeton University alumni
Fellows of New College, Oxford
Fellows of the Royal Society
Academics of the University of Bristol
Alumni of the University of Bristol
Wykeham Professors of Physics